Central Laborers' Pension Fund v. Heinz, 541 U.S. 739 (2004), is a case that was argued in the Supreme Court of the United States on 19 April 2004. The question it presented was whether Section 204(g) of the Employee Retirement Income Security Act contradicts Section 203(a)(3)(B).

See also
List of United States Supreme Court cases, volume 541
List of United States Supreme Court cases

Further reading

External links
 

United States Supreme Court cases
Employee Retirement Income Security Act of 1974
2004 in United States case law
Laborers' International Union of North America
United States Supreme Court cases of the Rehnquist Court
United States labor case law